Serge Emaleu Ngomgoue or Emaleu Serge (born 21 February 1985 in Bafoussam, West Region) is Cameroonian footballer who last played for Bontang FC.

Career in Indonesia

He debuted in Liga Indonesia in the 2005 season along with Arema Malang. He played 46 matches and scored 25 goals. He also managed to bring Arema Malang title at the event Piala Indonesia. He had been a top score of Piala Indonesia 2006 with a score 9 goals.

He had suffered a broken shin injury when dealing with Persipura Jayapura in Makassar Cup, ahead of the competition in 2007 Liga Indonesia Premier Division begin. The injury caused by tackling was hard from his compatriots of Cameroon Bio Paulin, it caused him to be absent for one year.

In the event 2008-09 Indonesia Super League he was recommended to strengthen Arema Malang back again by coach Bambang Nurdiansyah. In the second half of the season he was forced at the streak of Arema Malang team, because he was injured again.

He played for the club Persija Jakarta, he officially joined the Persija Jakarta from March 2010 on the second round of 2009-10 Indonesia Super League season. He transferred to Persija Jakarta from Liga Indonesia Premier Division participants are Pro Duta FC Yogyakarta.

Then he played for club Persela Lamongan, he had played 9 matches without scored any goal. Performance when he play had not reached the best as five years ago when it first played in Indonesia. It made fans of Persela Lamongan doubting him.

Currently he plays for club Persipasi Bekasi on the second round of 2010–11 Liga Indonesia Premier Division. He made 3 goals in 12 matches until the end of season.

Honours
Piala Indonesia
Champions : 2005 (with Arema FC)
Champions : 2006 (with Arema FC)

Individual Honours
Piala Indonesia
Top Scorer : 2006 (with Arema FC)

External links
 Serge Emaleu Ngomgoue at Liga-Indonesia.co.id

Living people
1985 births
Expatriate footballers in Indonesia
Cameroonian footballers
Liga 1 (Indonesia) players
Association football forwards
Arema F.C. players
Bontang F.C. players
Persija Jakarta players
Persela Lamongan players
Persipasi Bekasi players